An atmospheric theatre is a type of movie palace design which was popular in the late 1920s. Atmospheric theatres were designed and decorated to evoke the feeling of a particular time and place for patrons, through the use of projectors, architectural elements and ornamentation that evoked a sense of being outdoors. This was intended to make the patron a more active participant in the setting.

The most successful promoter of the style was John Eberson. He credited the Hoblitzelle Majestic Theatre (Houston, 1923) as the first. Before the end of the 1920s he designed around 100 atmospheric theatres in the U.S. and a few other countries, personally selecting the furnishings and art objects. His most notable surviving theatres in the United States include the Tampa Theatre (1926), Palace Theatre (1928), Majestic Theatre (1929), Paramount Theatre (1929), and the Loew's Theatre (1929). Remaining international examples include The Civic Theatre (1929, Auckland, New Zealand), The Forum (1929, Melbourne, Australia), as well as two theatres completed in Sydney, Australia, the Capitol Theatre (1928) and State Theatre (1929) (both designed by Henry Eli White with assistance from Eberson), and Le Grand Rex, (1932, Paris, France) which was designed by architect Auguste Bluysen with assistance from Eberson.

Atmospheric theatres in the United States

Designed by John Eberson
John Eberson was the most successful promoter and designer of the atmospheric style. The following seventeen of his atmospheric theatres in the United States are still in operation. 

New Regal Theater (originally Avalon Theater) (Chicago)
Moorish Revival
Akron Civic Theatre (Akron, Ohio)
The theater was built in 1929 by Marcus Loew and designed by theater architect John Eberson. It opened as Loew's (Akron) Theatre and seats 3,000 people. The auditorium is designed to resemble a night in a Moorish garden. Twinkling stars and drifting clouds travel across the domed ceiling. Located on Akron's South Main Street, the theater's entrance lobby extends over the Ohio and Erie Canal. The theater has a small multicolored terra cotta façade dominated by a large marquee. The interior of the entrance and lobby is designed to resemble a Moorish castle with Mediterranean decor, complete with medieval-style carvings, authentic European antiques and Italian alabaster sculptures. A grand full-sized Wurlitzer organ hidden beneath the stage rises to the stage level on a special elevator. In June 2001, the Akron Civic Theatre closed its doors for the most expensive and extensive renovation in its history in order to bring the theater up to modern performance and patron standards, and to restoring its failing 72-year-old infrastructure. The renovation cost just over $19 million, which included additional restroom facilities, new concession stands and expansion of the lobbies. The renovation allowed for the Civic to better serve customers with special needs by adding more handicapped seating and a new elevator. To bring the theatre up to new standards the dressing rooms were all redone and the stage was expanded from twenty-six feet to forty feet. Also added to the Civic was a freight elevator, a new loading dock and a cross-over space behind the stage's back wall. Other improvements included updating the sound system, HVAC, roof exterior, electrical service and modernizing the plumbing. The newly renovated Civic Theatre re-opened in November 2002.
Indiana Theatre (Terre Haute, Indiana)
The Indiana Theatre has a Spanish courtyard design and was one of the first Eberson theatres to exhibit atmospheric elements. While not fully atmospheric, the Indiana Theatre's original lighting system gave a blue hue to the auditorium ceiling and scattered light to simulate stars. The tile and terrazzo flooring, shapes of windows, prominence of Spanish coats of arms, Churrigueresque exterior, as well as numerous plaster designs that were seen first in the Indiana Theatre became a framework for later designs. Eberson stated, "Into this Indiana Theatre I have put my very best efforts and endeavors in the art of designing a modern theatre such as I have often pictured as what I would do were I given a free hand."
Majestic Theatre (Dallas, Texas) 
Renaissance Revival. The Majestic Theatre, constructed in 1920, was the first Eberson theatre to use a simulated outdoor sky ceiling.
Majestic Theatre, San Antonio 
Spanish courtyard
Olympia Theater and Office Building (Miami, FL) 
Moorish Revival
Orpheum Theatre (Wichita, Kansas)
Spanish courtyard
Palace Theatre (Canton, Ohio) 
Spanish courtyard
Palace Theatre (Marion, Ohio)
A John Eberson-designed theater, the Palace Theatre (Marion, Ohio) was built in 1928 and renovated in 1976.  With a Spanish Revival courtyard design, the theatre features low voltage lighting in the ceiling to mimic stars and the original reconditioned cloud machine to simulate moving clouds.  Alcoves in the theatre contain stuffed birds, including a macaw that Eberson sometimes included in his interior design work, and most of the original Pietro Caproni statues.
The Louisville Palace (Louisville, Kentucky) 
Spanish Baroque
Richmond CenterStage (formerly Palace (Carpenter) (Richmond, Virginia) 
Spanish-Moorish
Paramount Theatre (Anderson, Indiana) 
Spanish Courtyard
Astro Theatre (Omaha, Nebraska) (formerly Riviera Theatre) (Rose Blumkin Performing Arts Center) 
Hispano-Italian
Capitol Theatre Building (Flint, Michigan)
Italian courtyard
State Theatre (Kalamazoo, Michigan) 
Spanish courtyard
 Tampa Theatre (Tampa, Florida). 
The Tampa Theatre was built in 1926. Designed by John Eberson, the Tampa is a superior example of the atmospheric style featuring an auditorium that resembles a Mediterranean courtyard under a nighttime sky. Featured on the theater's opening night was the silent film The Ace of Cads starring Adolph Menjou.
 Uptown Theater (Kansas City, Missouri).
This John Eberson-designed Italian Renaissance atmospheric theater opened in 1928 and features an outdoor Mediterranean courtyard motif. It was built to seat 2,300, but the current configuration allows for 1,700.

Designed by other architects
Other architects also designed atmospheric theatres. These include the following:

 7th Street Theatre (Hoquiam, Washington)
The 7th Street Theatre was built in 1928, seats over 950 people, and features an outdoor Spanish garden motif.
 Aztec Theatre (San Antonio, Texas)
The Aztec Theatre was completed in 1926 and originally seated 2,500, with an auditorium reminiscent of a courtyard in a Mesoamerican temple complex.
 Coronado Theatre (Rockford, Illinois)
The Coronado Theatre was built in 1927 to a design by Frederic J. Klein, at a cost of $1.5 million. The auditorium is designed as a courtyard with Spanish and Italianate facades, painted clouds, and electric 'stars', with Japanese dragons and lanterns decorating the screens of the Barton organ. It was built to present both films and live entertainment, with a fully equipped stage and orchestra pit. Donated to the City of Rockford, it was restored 1998–2001, and primarily features live stage shows and music concerts.
Egyptian Theatre (DeKalb, Illinois) 
The Egyptian Theatre was built in 1929 with an Egyptian Revival design.  Designed by architect Elmer F. Behrns, who had an interest in Egyptology.  The theatre was saved in 1978 by a non-profit organization who has owned and operated the Theatre ever since.  There were once over 100 Egyptian Theatres built around the country, today there are only seven remaining in the United States and this is the only one east of the Rocky Mountains.  Listed on the National Register of Historic Places, the Egyptian Theatre in DeKalb, IL was named as one of the top 20 architectural treasures in the State of Illinois by the Illinois Office of Tourism in 2018.
Fox Theatre (Atlanta, Georgia)
The Fox Theatre was built in 1929, was designed by Ollivier J. Vinour of Marye Alger & Vinour,  and is the city's only surviving movie palace. The original architecture and décor can be roughly divided into two architectural styles: Islamic architecture (building exterior, auditorium, Grand Salon, mezzanine Gentlemen's Lounge and lower Ladies Lounge) and Egyptian architecture (Egyptian Ballroom, mezzanine Ladies Lounge and lower Gentlemen's Lounge). The 4,665-seat auditorium replicates an Arabian courtyard complete with a night sky of 96 embedded crystal "stars" (a third of which flicker) and a projection of clouds that slowly drift across the "sky".
 Fox Theatre (Visalia, California)
The Fox Theatre was built 1929–30. It was designed to evoke the garden of a South Asian temple.
 Gateway Theatre (Chicago, Illinois)
The Gateway Theatre was built in Chicago's Jefferson Park neighborhood, the Gateway Theatre is an atmospheric theater designed by architect Mason Rapp of the prestigious firm of Rapp & Rapp in 1930. It was the city's first movie theater built exclusively for the talkies.
 Merced Theatre (Merced, California)
The Merced Theatre was built in 1931, in a mix of Art Deco and Spanish Colonial Revival style. Its use of dramatic atmospheric features included castle facades and ventilators that sent "clouds" floating across the star-bespeckled ceiling.
 Midwest Theatre (Oklahoma City, Oklahoma)
(1931). John Eberson's last atmospheric design, 17 N. Harvey Ave., Oklahoma City.
 Music Box Theatre (Chicago, Illinois) 3733 N. Southport Ave. The Music Box opened on August 22, 1929.  It is still an operational single screen cinema with atmospheric effects.
 Paradise Center for the Arts (Faribault, Minnesota)
The Paradise Center for the Arts was Built in 1929 on the site of the former Faribault Opera House, the Paradise was recently renovated. The motif is one of a Moorish courtyard with Turkish caps over the doors, turrets and 'stonework' walls. Originally built to seat 915, the Paradise has been altered to seat 300.
 The Polk Theatre (Lakeland, Florida)
The Polk Theatre (Lakeland, Florida) was built in 1928 and designed by architect, James E. Casale and was built to simulate a Mediterranean village.
Saenger Theatre (New Orleans, Louisiana)
The Saenger Theatre (New Orleans, Louisiana) was built in 1927 for the Saenger Theatres chain by architect Emile Weil, Its interior evokes a baroque Florentine courtyard.  Originally seating approximately 4,000, in 1980 its seating was reduced to approximately 2,736 and it began to function as a performing arts center with occasional film screenings.
Keith-Albee Theatre (Huntington, West Virginia)
The Keith-Albee Theatre was opened to the public in 1928 as part of the Keith-Albee-Orpheum circuit, the premier vaudeville tour on the East Coast of the United States. Later on in its life, it showed movies and is now a performing arts center with occasional film screenings.
Orpheum Theatre (Phoenix, Arizona)
The Orpheum opened in 1929, and was used for vaudeville, movies, and as a touring Broadway theater. After falling into disrepair for some years, the Orpheum Theatre was purchased in 1984 by the city of Phoenix, which then began a 12-year, $14 million restoration. The Conrad Schmitt Studios created the transformation and the Orpheum reopened on January 28, 1997, with a performance of Hello, Dolly! starring Carol Channing. After the performance, Channing, still in costume but out of character, thanked the audience for "not turning this beautiful theatre into a parking lot!"
Arlington Theater (Santa Barbara, California)
The Arlington Theater was built in 1931 on the former site of the Arlington Hotel, which was destroyed following the 1925 earthquake. The current structure was erected in 1930 as a showcase movie house for Fox West Coast Theaters. It was restored and expanded in the mid-1970s by Metropolitan Theaters Corporation. It opened in its current incarnation in 1976.
 Paramount Theatre (Austin, Minnesota)
Built in 1929 by Wagner Construction; designed by the firm of Ellerbe & Company, the Paramount Theatre opened under the Publix banner on September 14, 1929, with a parade. Interior atmospheric design elements depict a quaint Spanish villa under the stars with Spanish Baroque exterior architecture. Now owned and operated by the Austin Area Commission for the Arts, an independent non profit, the theatre presents a full calendar of movies and performing arts.
Redford Theatre (Detroit, Michigan)
The Redford Theatre was built in 1927 as a silent film theatre and showed its first film in January 1928.  At present, it has 1610 seats and has a Japanese tea garden design.  The stars in the sky have been upgraded to use fiber optics.  The Redford theatre was purchased by the current owner, The Motor City Theatre Organ Society in the mid-1970s and now shows classic films, and hosts occasional stage events including rentals.  The theatre has a fully equipped stage with dressing rooms, and when it first opened was also intended to have vaudeville performances. The theatre's mission is to preserve the history of the film arts.  Silent films are still occasionally shown and when they are, they are accompanied by the theatre's 1928 Barton Theatre Organ which also has been restored and it is played prior to every film that is shown.

Atmospheric theatres outside of the United States

The following are atmospheric theatres located outside of the United States:
Auckland Civic Theatre (Auckland, New Zealand).
The Auckland Civic Theatre has the largest intact atmospheric auditorium in Australasia, built in 1929 and featuring an India-inspired motif. Seating 2,750 viewers, in 2000 it was restored to near-original condition. Peter Jackson used the Civic interiors in his remake of the film King Kong.
Columbia Theatre (New Westminster, British Columbia, Canada).
The Columbia Theatre is the oldest surviving atmospheric cinema in British Columbia, built in 1927 and featuring Moorish design lattice work, with Spanish garden murals and wrote irons. Originally built with over 900 seats, the theatre was divided into two levels and was most recently renovated as cabaret-style theatre.  Lafflines Comedy Club and Amicus Performing Arts Club operate this heritage theatre.
Capitol Theatre (Port Hope, Ontario, Canada)
The Capitol Theatre is located in Port Hope, Ontario, Canada, and is one of the last three atmospheric movie theatres still in operation in Canada. Constructed in 1930, the interior of the auditorium was designed to resemble a walled medieval courtyard surrounded by a forest. It was also one of the first cinemas in Canada built expressly for talking pictures. It opened on Friday, August 15, 1930, with the film "Queen High" starring Charles Ruggles and Ginger Rogers.
The Forum (Melbourne, Victoria, Australia)
Originally named The State, it was twinned between 1962–63 and survives as a live concert venue and cinema. When it opened in February 1929, the cinema had the largest seating capacity in Australia, holding 3,371 people. It was listed on the Victorian Heritage Register in 1978 and classified by the National Trust of Australia in 1994.
Capitol Theatre (Haymarket, New South Wales, Australia)
Designed by Henry Eli White with assistance from John Eberson, The Capitol Theatre is located in Haymarket, Sydney, New South Wales, Australia and is the only atmospheric auditorium to survive completely intact in Australia.
Le Grand Rex (Paris, France)
Le Grand Rex is the largest cinema, theater and music venue in Paris, with 2,800 seats. Opened in 1932, the cinema features a starred "sky" overhead, as well as interior fountains, and resembles a Mediterranean courtyard at night. The cinema features one of the largest screens in Europe. Atmospheric theatre pioneer John Eberson assisted architect Auguste Bluysen with the project.
 Lido Theatre (The Pas, Manitoba, Canada).
The Lido Theatre was built in 1929 and designed by Max Blankstein. The Lido is the world's longest continuously operating atmospheric theatre (87 years straight as of 2016). The interior features an outdoor Mediterranean courtyard motif. It was built to seat 600 people but the current configuration allows for 350. The Lido has avoided major renovations, remaining close to its original design. A rare survivor in its class, one of the few cinemas to stay in the same family for four generations, it remains owned by the Rivalin family.
 Mayfair Theatre (Ottawa, Ontario, Canada).
The Mayfair is a surviving atmospheric cinema of the Spanish Revival form, the second theatre house of this kind to be constructed in Ottawa. Interior features include four faux-balconies, two of which feature clay-tile canopies. Other significant features include stained-glass windows, a proscenium arch, a painted ceiling, decorative plastering and wrought ironwork. The Mayfair has retained the theatre clock used since its inception, a unit which features blue illuminated numbering.
Rialto Cinema (Dunedin, New Zealand).
The Rialto Cinema originally seated 2,000. The cinema has been converted into a six-theater multiplex. Renovations in 1998 restored its Moorish-themed features and night sky.
Roxy Theatre (Saskatoon, Canada).
Built during the onset of the Great Depression. The interior was decorated in a Spanish Villa style with the walls covered with small balconies, windows and towers that gave the impression of quaint Spanish village. The ceiling was painted in an atmospheric-style (dark blue and had twinkling lights set in the plaster) to give the impression of the night sky. 
Cineteca Alameda (San Luis Potosí City, Mexico).
Located in the city center. The Cineteca Alameda was opened on 27 February 1941 with Marlene Dietrich in "Seven Sinners". Seating was originally provided for over 1,000 in orchestra and balcony levels. In recent years it was used for concerts, film festivals and for screening classic movies, it seems to have closed in 2012, but had reopened by 2014 offering a mix of art house movies and live performances. It seem only the orchestra seating area is currently being used.
Palacio Chino (Mexico City, Mexico)
The fancy Palacio Chino opened on March 29, 1940. It used the shell of a former ball court, whose space was sufficient for a big movie theatre. It was the only one built ever in Mexico in Chinese style, but unlike the Grauman's Chinese, the interior was of the atmospheric type. In 1945 it was listed as having 4,000 seats in two levels, orchestra and balcony. It featured a fairly big stage, enough so to hold a symphony orchestra, and indeed was sometimes used as a music theater. Celibidache once directed the National Symphony Orchestra here, as an alternate theater to Bellas Artes, itself the home theater of said orchestra. The inevitable comparison with Grauman's Chinese stands only as original inspiration goes, because both buildings are very different. The Palacio Chino has a big, traditional flat facade, right in front of Iturbide street. The many windows of this facade are adorned as small pagodas, and there is a big, ornate marquee. The vestibule was spacious and full of Chinese decorations, even the ticket boots were rendered as pagodas. The auditorium was of the atmospheric type, with pagodas, temples and gold Buddha statues amid gardens. The ceiling was vault-like, not flat but very arched, and of course was painted deep blue. The screen was protected by a heavy black curtain, with Chinese motifs painted upon. The screen arch was very heavily decorated, with dragons appearing here and there.
Campbeltown Picture House (Campbeltown, Scotland)
Purpose-built cinema constructed in 1913. It was renovated in 1935 in the atmospheric style. It is the only surviving atmospheric theatre in Scotland.

References

Further reading
Earl, John. "Landscape in the Theatre: Historical Perspective." Landscape Research 16, no. 1 (1991): 21–29.
Hoffman, Scott L. A Theatre History of Marion, Ohio: John Eberson's Palace and Beyond. Charlotte, NC: The History Press. 2015.

Mendiola, Sister Christine. "The Atmospheric Style of Theatre Design." Masters Thesis, U. Akron. 1974.

Cinemas and movie theaters
Theatre
Film and video terminology
Atmospheric theatres